Robert Charles McKay (born December 27, 1947) is a former National Football League offensive lineman who played from 1970 through 1978, with the Cleveland Browns and New England Patriots.

As a college player at the University of Texas, McKay earned consensus All-American honors during the 1969 season, helping Texas win the national championship.

During a 1975 Browns home game against the rival Pittsburgh Steelers, "Mean Joe" Greene repeatedly kicked McKay in the groin. Greene was soon wrestled to the ground and punched by center Tom DeLeone and tight end Gary Parris, allowing McKay to throw several haymakers on Greene before referees restored order.

References

1947 births
Living people
All-American college football players
American football offensive linemen
Cleveland Browns players
New England Patriots players
Texas Longhorns football players
People from Seminole, Texas